Lepista arabica is a moth of the  subfamily Arctiinae. It was described by Rebel in 1907. It is found in Eritrea, Oman and Yemen.

References

 Natural History Museum Lepidoptera generic names catalog

Lithosiini
Moths described in 1907